is a fictional character who appears in games belonging to the Donkey Kong and Mario video game franchises, debuting in the 1994 Donkey Kong series game Donkey Kong Country. Nintendo designer Kevin Bayliss commented Diddy Kong was "penciled in" as a spider monkey, although he is not specifically referenced as belonging to a particular species. He lives with Donkey Kong on Donkey Kong Island in the Kongo Jungle, and is identified by his red hat with the Nintendo logo, and his red shirt with stars.

Diddy Kong is Donkey Kong's sidekick and best friend. Rare first referred to Diddy as DK's nephew in September 1999 on their website. This was followed in November 1999 where the manual for Donkey Kong 64 called him "Donkey's little nephew wannabe". The official cast for the game in 2002 listed him as "DK's nephew" as well. He was originally created by Donkey Kong Country developer Rare as an updated version of Donkey Kong Jr., but he was renamed, due to Nintendo's response. In the second game, Dixie Kong was introduced and they were described as "inseparable friends", with Cranky referring to Dixie as "that girlfriend of his".

Diddy Kong has made some appearances in the Donkey Kong series, appearing in every Donkey Kong Country game and Donkey Kong Land game, notably as the lead character in Donkey Kong Country 2: Diddy's Kong Quest with his inseparable friend Dixie Kong as his partner. He received a spin-off called Diddy Kong Racing, and more recently appeared as co-star to Donkey Kong in Donkey Kong Country Returns and Donkey Kong Country: Tropical Freeze. Through his relationship with Donkey Kong, Diddy Kong has become a prominent character in the Mario franchise. He has also become a playable character in the Super Smash Bros. series. Outside video games, Diddy Kong appeared in the TV show Donkey Kong Country, where he is played by Andrew Sabiston.

Since appearing in Donkey Kong Country, Diddy has received mostly positive reception, one strong enough to create a fan following, resulting in Diddy getting his own spin-off. He has been featured in several pieces of merchandise, including stuffed toys, candies, and two Amiibo figures.

Concept and creation
During the development of Donkey Kong Country, Diddy was originally conceived as an updated version of Donkey Kong Jr. (Donkey Kong's son). Not liking the radical changes Rare had made to Donkey Kong Jr., Nintendo told them either create a design that was closer to Donkey Kong Jr.'s original appearance for Donkey Kong Country or make their new version of him an entirely new character. Deciding to simply rename the character, who Rare felt was perfect for their updated version of Donkey Kong's world, Rare decided to name this Kong 'Diddy' because in some parts of the UK, the British English slang word 'diddy' means small.

Appearances
He first appearance was in Donkey Kong Country for the Super Nintendo Entertainment System as a young boisterous monkey who had one main goal: to become a video game hero just like his friend, Donkey Kong. He accompanies Donkey Kong throughout Donkey Kong Island to battle King K. Rool and return their banana hoard. He became the main character in the sequel Donkey Kong Country 2: Diddy's Kong Quest, teaming up with his inseparable friend Dixie Kong, who both set to rescue Donkey Kong from Kaptain K. Rool. He later appeared in Donkey Kong Land, issued a challenge by Cranky Kong that he and Donkey Kong could not retrieve the banana hoard on an 8-bit system. The third and final title in the Donkey Kong Country series is titled Donkey Kong Country 3: Dixie Kong's Double Trouble!, which stars Dixie Kong and Kiddy Kong who must find Diddy and Donkey Kong after they had disappeared, all the while battling a cyborg called KAOS. A follow-up was released in September 1996 for the Game Boy called Donkey Kong Land 2, featuring roughly the same plot as Donkey Kong Country 2. Diddy also makes an appearance in 1997's Donkey Kong Land III, but his appearance in the game is on the Extra Life Balloons. He is also a part of the storyline that appears in the manual.

He stars in the spin-off racing game Diddy Kong Racing for the Nintendo 64, which only features the eponymous character Diddy Kong as a returning character. It introduces Banjo and Conker the Squirrel, who went on to star in Banjo-Kazooie and Conker's Bad Fur Day, respectively. His title was a success, becoming the fastest-selling video game in US history at the time. In 2007, a remake of Diddy Kong Racing was released for the Nintendo DS. He later appeared as a playable character in Donkey Kong 64, a 3D sequel to the Donkey Kong Country titles, where he, Donkey Kong, and others go through DK Island to defeat King K. Rool yet again. He has a prominent role in DK King of Swing as well as its sequel, DK Jungle Climber.

2003 marked the release of the first post-Rare Donkey Kong game that features characters presented in Donkey Kong Country. Namco's Donkey Konga is a GameCube music title that was packaged with a DK Bongo controller. The controller is used to keep the rhythm with the beats of covers to famous songs (as well as Nintendo video game music). It was followed by two sequels, Donkey Konga 2 and Donkey Konga 3, the latter which was only released in Japan. Diddy Kong appears in Donkey Kong Barrel Blast as a playable character. He also appeared in Mario titles, including Mario Power Tennis, Mario Superstar Baseball, Mario Golf: Toadstool Tour, Mario Golf: World Tour, Mario Hoops 3-on-3, Mario Kart: Double Dash, Mario Kart Wii, Mario Strikers Charged, Mario Super Sluggers, Mario Tennis Open, Mario Tennis Aces, Mario Kart Tour and Mario Sports Mix. Diddy Kong also appears in Super Smash Bros. Brawl, in which some of his attacks are based on moves from Donkey Kong 64, such as the Peanut Popguns and Rocketbarrel Boost. He is rumored to appear as a DLC character in Mario Strikers: Battle League. 

Diddy appears in Donkey Kong Country Returns and its 3DS port, where he serves as the second player's character. He also appeared in Donkey Kong Country: Tropical Freeze alongside Dixie, Cranky, Funky and DK. He returns as a playable fighter in Super Smash Bros. for Nintendo 3DS and Wii U and Super Smash Bros. Ultimate. He also appeared in Skylanders: SuperChargers, riding in the side car of Donkey Kong's vehicle, called the Barrel Blaster. His most recent appearance was in Super Mario Party as a playable character for the second time in a Mario Party game, after Mario Party: Star Rush.

In other media
Diddy Kong was in the Donkey Kong Country animated series, where his role as Donkey Kong's sidekick remained relatively the same as in the games. He was voiced by Andrew Sabiston (who previously played Yoshi in Super Mario World produced by DiC Entertainment). Diddy Kong has also appeared in various comics featured in official Nintendo magazines. Some of the stories he appeared in include adaptations of Donkey Kong Country, Donkey Kong Country 2: Diddy's Kong Quest and Donkey Kong 64, as well as original stories. Super Mario Maker and Super Mario Odyssey features Diddy as a costume for Mario to wear, the former as a full costume, the latter as clothes.

Reception
Since appearing in Donkey Kong Country, Diddy Kong has received mostly positive reception. He has gained a fan following, leading to him getting his own spin-off title called Diddy Kong Racing. He has been featured as a plush toy. Kotaku editor Mike Fahey described him as the "Scrappy Doo" of the Donkey Kong series. Ars Technica editor Ben Kuchera criticized the removal of Diddy and Donkey Kong in Donkey Kong Country 3: Dixie Kong's Double Trouble!, commenting that the new characters made the game less appealing. GameDaily listed DK and Diddy as collectively one of the best gaming duo. GameSpy editor Phil Theobald jokingly bemoaned the lack of a mini-game in Donkey Konga that allows players to smack Diddy Kong, criticizing Rare's designs, which he calls horrible. UGO.com listed Diddy Kong on their list of "The Cutest Video Game Characters" stating that Diddy has Donkey Kong as a role model. Samuel James Riley of GamesRadar listed Diddy Kong along with Donkey Kong as the best video game duos, and further stated that while they may not be the most talkative of double acts, these plucky primate do share something of an interesting relationship. Nick Gillett of The Guardian and David Lozada of GameRevolution both described Diddy Kong as one of the best video game sidekicks.

Jeremy Parish of Polygon ranked 73 fighters from Super Smash Bros. Ultimate "from garbage to glorious", listing Diddy as 47th, stating that "Diddy Kong is really just the poor man's Donkey Kong Jr. Sadly, Junior himself is said to have died in the Great Ape War, which means we're stuck with this second banana. But we don't have to like it". Gavin Jasper of Den of Geek ranked Diddy Kong as 24th of Super Smash Bros. Ultimate characters, and said that "Diddy had peanut pistols and a jetpack, coming off as a primitive James Bond with the tactical height of Oddjob. Which is pretty cool".

References

Animal characters in video games
Anthropomorphic video game characters
Child characters in video games
Donkey Kong characters
Fictional monkeys
Male characters in video games
Mario (franchise) characters
Nintendo protagonists
Super Smash Bros. fighters
Video game sidekicks
Video game characters introduced in 1994